Motts Creek is a stream in the Town of Hempstead in Nassau County, on the South Shore of Long Island, in New York, United States.

Description 
Motts Creek runs between Franklin Square and Jamaica Bay. The creek begins underneath Rath Park in Franklin Square, flowing towards the south, west, and southwest to Jamaica Bay.

Communities which Motts Creek passes through include Franklin Square, Lynbrook, Malverne, Valley Stream, and Woodmere.

Many portions of the creek have been redirected over the years as a result of suburban development and growth. The re-routed sections include culverts and the straightening of the route. A notable section which has been altered is the section underneath Rath Park; this section flows through a storm drain.

From there, Motts Creek continues towards the southwest to Jamaica Bay.

USGS monitoring station 
The United States Geological Survey operates a water monitoring station along Motts Creek. The monitoring station, located off of Rosedale Road, has a monitoring station ID of 01311200.

See also 

 Mill River – Another north-south river on Long Island, located slightly to the east, flowing into Hewlett Bay from West Hempstead.

References 

Hempstead, New York
Rivers of New York (state)